Ilo Veyou is the fourth studio album by French singer Camille, released on October 7, 2011.

Track listing
 "Aujourd'hui"
 "L'étourderie"
 "Allez allez allez"
 "Wet Boy"
 "She Was"
 "Mars Is No Fun"
 "Le Berger"
 "Bubble Lady"
 "Ilo Veyou"
 "Message"
 "La France"
 "My Man Is Married But Not to Me"
 "Pleasure"
 "Le Banquet"
 "Tout Dit"

Musicians
 Clément Ducol: Guitar, prepared piano, arrangements
 Christelle Lassort, Guillaume Roger, Jean-Marie Baudour: Violin
 Martin Rodriguez: Viola
 Anaïs Belorgey: Cello
 Maxime Duhem: Tuba
 Marianne Tilquin: Horn
 Alexander Angelov, Martin Gamet: Double bass

2011 albums
Camille (singer) albums